Morenosaurus is an extinct genus of plesiosaur from the Cretaceous of what is now California. The type species is Morenosaurus stocki, first named by Samuel Welles in 1943, in honor of Dr. Chester Stock. The species was found by Robert Wallace and Arthur Drescher in the Panoche Hills region of Fresno County. The skeleton was originally mounted at Caltech but is now in the Natural History Museum of Los Angeles County.

Morenosaurus may have been similar to Elasmosaurus or Thalassomedon, but studies in the early 2000s indicated that the fossils were too scrappy to identify to the family level.

See also

 List of plesiosaur genera
 Timeline of plesiosaur research

References

 Sepkoski, J.J. (2002). A compendium of fossil marine animal genera. Bulletins of American Paleontology 363: 1-560.
 Drunkenmiller, Patrick S. and Russell, Anthony P. (2006). A new elasmosaurid plesiosaur (Reptilia: Sauropterygia) from the Lower Cretaceous Clearwater Formation, northeastern Alberta, Canada. Paludicola 5 (4): 184-199.

External links
 Morenosaurus from the PaleoBiology Database
 Morenosaurus at the Natural History Museum

Late Cretaceous plesiosaurs of North America
Elasmosaurids
Taxa named by Samuel Paul Welles
Sauropterygian genera